Arthur Irwin Dasent (8 May 1859 – 21 November 1939) was a British civil servant, miscellaneous writer, and biographer of his uncle John Thadeus Delane.

Arthur Irwin Dasent, the youngest son of Sir George Webbe Dasent, was born in 1859 in Westminster and educated at Eton. He entered the civil service and became a clerk in the House of Commons. From 1921 to 1929 he was the first Clerk of the Parliaments of Northern Ireland. He wrote several books on the history of parts of London and numerous articles for The Saturday Review of Politics, Literature, Science, and Art, The Spectator, and similar periodicals.

In 1901, he married Helen Augusta Essex Veronica, daughter of Lieutenant Colonel Alfred Tippinge, Grenadier Guards, of Longparish House, Longparish, Hampshire; they had one son.

Books
 
 
 
 
 
  (See Lancaster House.)

References

External links

English biographers
1859 births
1939 deaths
People educated at Eton College